In biology, the BBCH-scale for beet describes the phenological development of beet plants using the BBCH-scale.

The phenological growth stages and BBCH-identification keys of beet are:

References

 

BBCH-scale